Carsten Mogens Hansen (born 10 January 1957) is a Danish Social Democrat politician. He has been a member of the Folketing—the parliament of Denmark—since 1998. He was formerly the Minister for the city, Housing and Rural Affairs in the Cabinet of Helle Thorning-Schmidt.

External links 
 Official biography from Folketinget 

1957 births
Living people
Members of the Folketing
Social Democrats (Denmark) politicians
Government ministers of Denmark
Members of the Folketing 1998–2001
Members of the Folketing 2001–2005
Members of the Folketing 2005–2007
Members of the Folketing 2007–2011
Members of the Folketing 2011–2015